Confederate Rest, in Forest Hill Cemetery, Madison, Wisconsin, is the northernmost Confederate graveyard in the nation.  140 Confederate prisoners of war who died under Union captivity lie in it.

History

Origins

Following the Battle of Island Number Ten, about 1400 Confederate soldiers who surrendered there, many from the 1st Regiment Alabama Infantry, were taken at the end of April, 1862, to the Union training field Camp Randall in Madison, Wisconsin, which was found to be unsuitable, resulting in the deaths of 140 prisoners before the remaining survivors were sent to Camp Douglas (Chicago) at the end of May, 1862.

Mass grave and reorganization
The dead prisoners were interred in a mass grave.  In the early years, Alice Waterman, a Madison resident who lived near the cemetery, cared for the burial grounds using her own funds.  Later, each deceased was given his own tombstone.

Confederate cenotaph removed
In January 2019, after a year-long debate, a stone cenotaph etched with the names of the 140 Confederate prisoners of war was removed from the cemetery by the Madison Parks Department and transferred to storage at the Wisconsin Veterans Museum.

References

Confederate States of America cemeteries
Geography of Madison, Wisconsin
Cemeteries in Wisconsin
Protected areas of Dane County, Wisconsin